Clough Castle is an 11th century Anglo-Norman motte-and-bailey castle located in Clough, County Down, Northern Ireland.

History
Clough Castle was constructed during the 12th century by John de Courcy. The castle may have been abandoned during the early 14th century before it was rebuilt as a tower house in the 15th century.

Excavations took place during the 1950s, which revealed a wooden palisade that had originally surrounded the summit of the motte.

References

Buildings and structures in County Down
Castles in County Down